Amit Bitton (or Biton, ; born 24 July 1996) is an Israeli footballer who plays as a centre back for Israeli National League club Bnei Yehuda.

Early life
Bitton was born in  Be'er Sheva, Israel, to a family of Sephardic Jewish (Moroccan-Jewish) descent. He is the son of former Israeli footballer and manager Shimon Bitton.

He also holds a Portuguese passport, which eased his move to certain European football leagues.

Club career

Bitton grew up in the youth division of Hapoel Be'er Sheva. On 2 March 2016, the 2015–16 season, Bitton made his debut in the Hapoel Be'er Sheva alumni team in a 2–0 victory over Beitar Tel Aviv Ramla in the State Cup.

In the 2016–17 season, Bitton was finally promoted to the senior team. In 30 July Bitton made his debut in the Toto Cup in a 5–0 win over Hapoel Ashkelon. Bitton managed to win 7 games in the Toto Cup and win the title after a 4–1 win over Ironi Kiryat Shmona. In the winter transfer window was borrowed from Bitton Hapoel Tel Aviv until the end of the season. On 21 January 2017 Bitton made his debut in a 1–0 win over Hapoel Ashkelon. Later in the season he managed 13 appearances for Hapoel Tel Aviv.

In the 2017–18 season, Bitton was loaned to Hapoel Acre until the end of the season. In 30 July he made his debut in the Toto Cup with a 4–0 loss to the Ironi Kiryat Shmona. In 20 August Bitton made his debut in a 2–1 loss to Bnei Sakhnin. During the game, Bitton scored his first goal in a team of alumni. In the winter transfer window was borrowed from Bitton Ashdod  until the end of the season. On 7 February 2018 Bitton made his debut in Ashdod in the first game of the quarterfinals of the State Cup in a 1–1 draw against Hapoel Ra'anana. In 29 April Bitton made his debut in the Premier League in a 1–0 win over Hapoel Ashkelon.

In the 2018–19 season, Bitton was loaned back to Ashdod until the end of the season. In 1 August Bitton made his debut for this season with a 3–0 loss to Maccabi Petah Tikva. In 25 August Bitton made his debut for this season in a 1–0 win for Bnei Yehuda in the Premier League. In the winter transfer window was borrowed from Bitton Bnei Yehuda until the end of the season. On 10 February 2019 Bitton made his debut in Bnei Yehuda 4–0 win over Hapoel Hadera in the Premier League. Later in the season in 15 May he won the State Cup with Bnei Yehuda after a 4–5 win in penalties.

Honours
Bnei Yehuda
State Cup (1): 2018–19

Hapoel Be'er Sheva 
State Cup (1): 2019–20

References

External links

1996 births
Living people
Israeli footballers
Israeli Sephardi Jews
Israeli Mizrahi Jews
Hapoel Be'er Sheva F.C. players
Hapoel Tel Aviv F.C. players
Hapoel Acre F.C. players
F.C. Ashdod players
Bnei Yehuda Tel Aviv F.C. players
PFC Beroe Stara Zagora players
Israeli Premier League players
First Professional Football League (Bulgaria) players
Footballers from Beersheba
Israeli expatriate footballers
Expatriate footballers in Bulgaria
Israeli expatriate sportspeople in Bulgaria
Israeli people of Moroccan-Jewish descent
Association football central defenders